Makang'wa is an administrative ward in the Chamwino District of the Dodoma Region of Tanzania. In 2016 the Tanzania National Bureau of Statistics report there were 7,937 people in the ward, from 20,337 in 2012.

References

Wards of Dodoma Region